The Single Factor, released in 1982, is the ninth studio album by English progressive rock band Camel. The album was essentially a contractual obligation album, created under pressure from Decca Records to produce a hit single, and the "made-to-order" nature of its composition resulted in a selection of songs described as "odd" on the band's official website. Unlike previous Camel albums, The Single Factor consists exclusively of shorter compositions around 3 to 5 minutes in length.

Guitarist Andrew Latimer was the only original member remaining, although original keyboardist Peter Bardens returned for a guest appearance on 'Sasquatch'. According to the liner notes, original drummer Andy Ward, who had appeared in all previous Camel albums, was now absent "following a serious injury to his hand". In reality the injury was self-inflicted, and years later it was revealed that he was forced to retire due to mental health problems.

The album was reissued on 8 September 2009 by Esoteric Recordings with a bonus version of "You Are the One".

Background and recording
Anthony Phillips is featured on the album, playing guitar, organ and synthesizer. According to Phillips, a song "with big Genesis-sounding, slightly choral keyboard phrases with super soaring guitar over it" was also recorded for the album, but the band decided to leave it off "because it didn't have 'the Single Factor'."

Track listing
All songs written by Andy Latimer, except where noted.

Personnel
 Andy Latimer – lead vocals, guitar, piano, keyboards, Mellotron (B 2), organ (B 4), bass (B 2), flute (A 3)
 David Paton – bass, backing vocals, lead vocals (A 3)
 Chris Rainbow – backing vocals, lead vocals (B 5)
 Anthony Phillips – organ (A 3, B 2), grand piano (A 3, B 2, 6), Polymoog (B 2, 6), ARP 2600 (B 6), marimba (B 6), acoustic guitar (A 4), 12-string guitar (B1)
 Graham Jarvis – drums
 Peter Bardens – organ, Minimoog (B1)
 Haydn Bendall – Yamaha CS80 synthesizer (A 3)
 Duncan Mackay – Prophet synthesizer (A 4)
 Francis Monkman – Synclavier (B 2)
 Dave Mattacks – drums (A 3)
 Simon Phillips – drums (B 1)
 Tristan Fry – glockenspiel (B 2)
 Jack Emblow – accordion (B 5)

Production
 Tony Clarke – engineer

Charts

References

1982 albums
Camel (band) albums